Cole Township is a township in Benton County, in the U.S. state of Missouri. Cole Township was formed in February 1835, taking its name from Captain Stephen Cole, an Indian fighter and pioneer settler.

References

Townships in Missouri
Townships in Benton County, Missouri